Michael Cayley (May 15, 1842 – December 3, 1878) was a Quebec lawyer and political figure. He represented Beauharnois in the House of Commons of Canada as a Conservative member from 1867 to 1872 and again in 1878.

He was born in Kilkenny, Ireland and educated at St. Hyacinthe, Quebec. Cayley studied law and was called to the bar in 1864. He practised law in Beauharnois. He was elected to the House of Commons in 1867 but defeated in 1872. Cayley died in Montreal less than three months after being reelected in 1878 at the age of 36.

References 

1842 births
1878 deaths
Anglophone Quebec people
Conservative Party of Canada (1867–1942) MPs
Members of the House of Commons of Canada from Quebec
Irish emigrants to pre-Confederation Quebec
People from Beauharnois, Quebec
People from Kilkenny (city)
Immigrants to the Province of Canada